The Central Theater Command Ground Force is the ground force under the Central Theater Command. Its headquarters is in Shijiazhuang, Hebei.

History 
The Central Theater Command Ground Force was officially established on 31 December 2015 with the troops of former Beijing Military Region, Jinan Military Region and Guangzhou Military Region.

Functional department 
 General Staff
 Political Work Department
 Logistics Department
 Equipment department
 Disciplinary Inspection Committee

Direct units

Direct troops

Group army 
 81st Group Army (stations in Zhangjiakou, Hebei)
 82nd Group Army (stations in Baoding, Hebei)
 83rd Group Army (stations in Xinxiang, Henan)

Other army 
 Fifth Brigade of Reconnaissance Intelligence
 Fifth Brigade of Information Support
 Fifth Brigade of Electronic Warfare
 32nd Brigade of Boat and Bridge Army

List of leaders

Commanders

Political commissars

Chief of staffs

References 

Central Theater Command
Beijing Military Region
Guangzhou Military Region
Jinan Military Region
Military units and formations established in 2015
2015 establishments in China